What I'm Cut Out to Be is a studio album by American country music artist Dottie West featuring the title song written by Red Lane. It was released in March 1968 on RCA Victor Records and was produced by Chet Atkins. It was West's eighth studio recording issued during her career. The album was a collection of new recordings and cover versions. The album did however reach peak positions on national publication charts at the time of its release.

Background and content
What I'm Cut Out to Be was recorded in November 1967 at RCA Studio B, a venue where West had cut most of her 1960's sessions. The album was produced by Chet Atkins. Atkins crafted the album in the Nashville Sound style of country music. The album itself consisted of 11 tracks. Some of the album's tracks were cover versions of songs first recorded by others. Many of the tracks were covers of songs by country artists. However some were covers of pop recordings. Among its pop covers was Roy Orbison's "Crying", the final track on the record. It also includes a recording of Tammy Wynette's "I Don't Wanna Play House". Several of the compositions, including the title track, was composed by songwriter Red Lane. Lane had also written the album's liner notes. "What I'm Cut Out to Be is the understatement of the decade for Dottie West. She is the ultimate of the word 'talent'," Lane wrote.

Release and reception
What I'm Cut Out to Be was officially released in March 1968 on RCA Victor Records. It became West's eighth studio album at the time of its release. It was originally issued as a vinyl LP, containing six songs on "side one" and five songs on "side two" of the record. It was later re-released to digital and streaming retailers in 2018 by Sony Music Entertainment. The record spent 11 weeks on the Billboard Top Country Albums chart before peaking at number 18 in June 1968. What I'm Cut Out to Be became West's sixth album to make the latter chart. No singles were released or included from the project. Upon its release, What I'm Cut Out to Be received positive reception from Billboard magazine in their March 1968 issue. "Dottie's vocals are full of heart and style and they really cause a lump in the throat," staff writers said. They also highlighted the album tracks "My Baby's Gone" and "Where Love Is".

Track listing

Original vinyl version

Digital version

Personnel
All credits are adapted from the liner notes of What I'm Cut Out to Be.

Musical personnel
 Harold Bradley – guitar
 Jerry Carrigan – drums
 Floyd Cramer – piano
 Ray Edenton – guitar
 Buddy Harman – drums
 Roy Huskey – bass
 The Jordanaires – background vocals
 Grady Martin – guitar
 Charlie McCoy – harmonica, vibes
 Bob Moore – bass
 Wayne Moss – guitar
 Henry Strzelecki – bass
 Bill West – steel guitar
 Dottie West – lead vocals

Technical personnel
 Chet Atkins – producer
 Red Lane – liner notes
 Jim Malloy – engineering
 Cam Mullins – arrangement

Chart performance

Release history

References

1968 albums
Albums produced by Chet Atkins
Dottie West albums
RCA Records albums